In mathematics, the necklace ring is a ring introduced by  to elucidate the multiplicative properties of necklace polynomials.

Definition

If A is a commutative ring then the necklace ring over A consists of all infinite sequences  of elements of A. Addition in the necklace ring is given by pointwise addition of sequences.

This ring structure is isomorphic to the multiplication of formal power series written in "necklace coordinates": that is, identifying an integer sequence  with the power series .

See also

 Witt vector

References

Ring theory